The Zwijnaarde science park is a science park of Ghent University, located in Zwijnaarde near Ghent (Belgium). The science park has an area of 52 hectare (ha) and comprises the Ardoyen campus (30 ha) of the University of Ghent and the Ardoyen science park (22 ha). The Ardoyen campus comprises several institutes of the engineering and science faculty of the university. The science park comprises a business incubator and about 40 companies employing about 1500 scientists. Most of the companies are biotech and ICT companies, which are spin-offs of the university or the Flanders Institute for Biotechnology (VIB).

See also
Technologiepark Zwijnaarde
TechTransfer UGent
Techlane
Universiteit Gent:
Faculty of Engineering and Architecture: 
 Department of Architecture and urban planning
 Department of Flow, heat and combustion mechanics
 Department of Information technology
 Department of Electronics and information systems
 Department of Telecommunications and information processing
 Department of Electrical energy, metals, mechanical constructions and systems
 Department of Materials, textiles and chemical engineering
 Department of Structural engineering
 Department of Civil engineering
 Department of Mathematical analysis
 Department of Applied physics
 Department of Industrial systems engineering and product design
 IGent: Faculty of Engineering and Architecture: 
 Department of Electronics and information systems
 Department of Information technology
Science and technology in Flanders
Greenbridge science park
 Innogenetics
 DevGen
 CropDesign

External links
Technologiepark Zwijnaarde

Science parks in Belgium
Flanders